Molino d'Egola is a village in Tuscany, central Italy, administratively a frazione of the comune of San Miniato, province of Pisa.

Molino d'Egola is about 43 km from Pisa and 6 km from San Miniato.

References

Bibliography 
 

Frazioni of the Province of Pisa